Baidrabad is a village in Arwal district of Bihar in India.

The present name of the village dates back to 1935. Magahi and Khariboli (a dialect of Hindi) are the main languages spoken here. The Son river passes near the village.

The nearest villages, cities and towns are Bela, Arrah, Aurangabad, Gaya and Patna, Bhagan Bigha, which is the closest village to Baidrbad. The PIN code is 804402.

References

Villages in Arwal district